Ōkuma Tomohide (大熊朝秀; 1517 – 3 April 1582) was a Japanese samurai of the Sengoku period. He served the Uesugi clan, but later switched allegiances and became a retainer of the Takeda clan of Kai Province. He died with Takeda Katsuyori at the Battle of Tenmokuzan.

Tomohide's descendants became the chief retainers of the Sanada clan.

References 

Samurai
1582 deaths
Uesugi retainers
Takeda retainers
Place of birth unknown
Date of birth unknown
1517 births